This is a list of rivers in Kansas (U.S. state).

By drainage basin
This list is arranged by drainage basin, with respective tributaries indented under each larger stream's name.

Mississippi River Basin

Arkansas River Basin 
Arkansas River
Neosho River
Spring River
Shoal Creek
Cottonwood River
Verdigris River
Caney River
Elk River
Fall River
Cimarron River
North Fork Cimarron River
Salt Fork Arkansas River
Chikaskia River
Medicine Lodge River
Grouse Creek
Walnut River
Little Walnut River
Whitewater River
Ninnescah River
North Fork Ninnescah River
South Fork Ninnescah River
Little Arkansas River
Cow Creek
Rattlesnake Creek
Walnut Creek
Pawnee River
Buckner Creek
Bear Creek

Missouri River Basin 
Missouri River
Osage River (MO)
Little Osage River
Marmaton River
Marais des Cygnes River
Blue River
Brush Creek
Kansas River
Stranger Creek
Wakarusa River
Delaware River
Mission Creek
Big Blue River
Black Vermillion River
Little Blue River
Indian Creek
Republican River
Buffalo Creek
White Rock Creek
Prairie Dog Creek
Sappa Creek
Beaver Creek
Little Beaver Creek
South Fork Republican River
Arikaree River
Smoky Hill River
Solomon River
North Fork Solomon River
South Fork Solomon River
Saline River
Big Creek
Hackberry Creek
Ladder Creek
North Fork Smoky Hill River
Wolf River
Big Nemaha River

Alphabetically 
Arikaree River
Arkansas River
Beaver Creek
Big Blue River
Big Creek
Big Nemaha River
Black Vermillion River
Blue River
Brush Creek
Buckner Creek
Buffalo Creek
Caney River
Chikaskia River
Cimarron River
Cottonwood River
Cow Creek
Delaware River
Elk River
Fall River
Grouse Creek
Hackberry Creek
Kansas River
Ladder Creek
Little Arkansas River
Little Beaver Creek
Little Blue River
Little Osage River
Little Walnut River
Marais des Cygnes River
Marmaton River
Medicine Lodge River
Mission Creek
Missouri River
Neosho River
Ninnescah River
North Fork Ninnescah River
North Fork Smoky Hill River
North Fork Solomon River
Pawnee River
Prairie Dog Creek
Rattlesnake Creek
Republican River
Saline River
Salt Fork Arkansas River
Sappa Creek
Shoal Creek
Smoky Hill River
Solomon River
South Fork Ninnescah River
South Fork Republican River
South Fork Solomon River
Spring River
Stranger Creek
Verdigris River
Wakarusa River
Walnut Creek
Walnut River
White Rock Creek
Whitewater River
Wolf River

By size
Mean flow in cubic feet of water per second (cfs).  One cubic foot equals .0283 cubic meters

Source: "Annual Water Data Report" USGS, 2009. http://waterdata.usgs.gov/ks/nwis/current/?type=flow. Navigate to page 3 of reports on individual monitoring stations.  Average water flow totals will vary slightly from year to year.

See also
List of rivers in the United States

References
USGS Geographic Names Information Service
USGS Hydrologic Unit Map - State of Kansas (1974)

External links
 M. A. Sophocleous and B. B. Wilson, "Surface Water in Kansas and its Interactions With Groundwater"
 USGS: Water resources in Kansas: streamflow conditions map

Kansas
 
Rivers